Philip Joper Escueta (born August 23, 1993) is a Filipino badminton player. Escueta and his partner in men's doubles, Ronel Estanislao, won a bronze medal in the 2015 Southeast Asian Games. Escueta currently coaches the Philippines national badminton team.

Career 
In his junior days, he played in the men's singles discipline and competed in a few BWF Superseries tournaments. In 2011, he competed in the 2011 BWF World Junior Championships.

Philip made his transition to playing men's doubles fully in 2012. He also represented the Philippines in the world mixed team tournament, also known as the Sudirman Cup.

In 2015, he competed in the 2015 Southeast Asian Games in Singapore. He and his partner Ronel Estanislao unexpectedly beat home favourites Terry Hee and Hendra Wijaya in the first round. They would go onto beating Ngoun Kanora and Teav Yongvannak in the quarterfinals and guaranteed themselves a bronze medal. They lost the semifinal to world number 1 pair of Marcus Fernaldi Gideon and Kevin Sanjaya Sukamuljo. This is his biggest career achievement to date.

Achievements

Southeast Asian Games 
Men's doubles

References 

Living people
1993 births
Sportspeople from Laguna (province)
Filipino male badminton players
Competitors at the 2015 Southeast Asian Games
Competitors at the 2017 Southeast Asian Games
Competitors at the 2019 Southeast Asian Games
Southeast Asian Games bronze medalists for the Philippines
Southeast Asian Games medalists in badminton